Jason Thomas Butler Harner (born October 9, 1970) is an American actor.

Life and career
Harner was born in Elmira, New York and grew up in suburban Northern Virginia, where he saw a handful of plays at Washington, D.C.’s Arena Stage. His middle name Butler is his mother’s maiden name. He graduated from T. C. Williams High School, Alexandria, Virginia, in 1988. Although Harner was the president of his high school drama club, he spent his time building sets rather than acting since many of his relatives were carpenters or plumbers.

At 17, after graduating from high school, he worked as an usher at the Eisenhower Theater, part of the Kennedy Center in Washington, D.C.

He graduated from VCU with a Bachelor of Fine Arts in acting in 1992. After graduating from VCU, he was an apprentice at Actors Theatre of Louisville; he subsequently moved to New York City and received a Master of Fine Arts in the Graduate Acting Program from Tisch School of the Arts in 1997. Harner returned to VCU as a Master Teacher during their 2007-08 Guest Artist program.

Harner completed filming for Changeling in December 2007. He played Gordon Stewart Northcott, a serial killer responsible for the Wineville Chicken Coop murders.

He appeared in the HBO miniseries John Adams as Oliver Wolcott, Jr., the second United States Secretary of the Treasury. Harner had a guest role on the pilot for Fringe, which premiered in September 2008 on Fox. He was cast as the regular character Silas Hunton on the cable series Possible Side Effects, until Showtime cancelled the series in April 2008. He plays Associate Warden Elijah Bailey "E.B." Tiller on the Fox series Alcatraz which debuted in January 2012.

He made his London theater debut in February 2010 in the Lanford Wilson play Serenading Louie at Donmar Warehouse, London, England. During his stay in London, Harner read Michael Chabon's Manhood for Amateurs on BBC Book of the Week in April 2010.

Theatrical career

 1990: In What I Did Last Summer play by A. R. Gurney (Shafer Street Theatre, Richmond, Virginia).
 May 1994: In Loved Less (The History of Hell) play by Brian Jucha (Via Theater Downtown Art Company, New York City, New York).
 1997: In Hydriotaphia, or the Death of Dr. Browne play by Tony Kushner.
 June 1997: Plays Sir Henry Guildford/Page/Garter/King of Arms Henry VIII play by William Shakespeare (Joseph Papp Public Theater/New York Shakespeare Festival, New York City, New York).
 July 1998: Plays Demarais the servant in Transit of Venus play by Maureen Hunter (Berkshire Theatre Festival, Stockbridge, Massachusetts)
 October 1999: Plays Donalbain/Murderer in Macbeth play by William Shakespeare (Joseph Papp Public Theater/New York Shakespeare Festival, New York City, New York).
 October 1999: Plays Thomas Armstrong/Phil in An Experiment with an Air Pump play by Shelagh Stephenson (Manhattan Theatre Club Stage I, New York City, New York).
 January 2000: Plays Young Housman opposite James Cromwell in the American premiere of The Invention of Love play by Tom Stoppard (American Conservatory Theater, San Francisco, California).
 September 2000: Plays Johnny Boyle in Juno and the Paycock play by Seán O'Casey (Gramercy Theatre, New York City, New York).
 April 2001: Plays Barnett opposite Amy Ryan in Crimes of the Heart play by Beth Henley (Second Stage Theatre, New York City, New York).
 February 2003: Plays David Craig in Observe the Sons of Ulster Marching Towards the Somme play by Frank McGuinness (Mitzi E. Newhouse Theater, New York City, New York).
 September 2003: Plays Hamlet in Hamlet play by William Shakespeare (Dallas Theater Center, Dallas, Texas).
 January 2004: Plays Ed in Five Flights play by Adam Bock (Rattlestick, New York City, New York).
 April 2004: Plays Harlequin/Tyler/Stage Crew in Mr. Fox: A Rumination play by Bill Irwin (Peter Norton Space, New York City, New York).
 August 2004: Plays Tom Wingfield opposite Sally Field in The Glass Menagerie play by Tennessee Williams (The Kennedy Center, Washington, DC).
 September 2004: Plays Tesman opposite Elizabeth Marvel in Hedda Gabler play by Henrik Ibsen (New York Theatre Workshop, New York City, New York).
 April 2005: Plays David in Orange Flower Water play by Craig Wright (Theater for the New City, New York City, New York).
 June 2005: Plays Young Anton/Burt Sarris opposite John Glover in The Paris Letter play by Jon Robin Baitz (Laura Pels Theatre, New York City, New York).
 November 2005: Plays Tad Rose in The Ruby Sunrise opposite Marin Ireland, Richard Masur and Maggie Siff play by Rinne Groff (Joseph Papp Public Theater/Martinson Hall, New York City, New York).
 March 2006: Plays Trofimov opposite Annette Bening and Alfred Molina in The Cherry Orchard play by Anton Chekhov (Mark Taper Forum, Los Angeles, California).
 October 2006: Plays Sterling opposite Dylan Baker, Joanna Gleason, Brian d'Arcy James, David Rakoff and Joey Slotnick in The Cartells: A Prime Time Soap . . . Live play  by Douglas Carter Beane (Drama Dept. and Comix, New York City, New York).
 November 2006: Plays Ivan Turgenev in the trilogy The Coast of Utopia: Voyage, The Coast of Utopia: Shipwreck, and Coast of Utopia: Salvage plays by Tom Stoppard (Lincoln Center Theater, New York City, New York).
 July 2007: Plays Hildy opposite Richard Kind in The Front Page play by Ben Hecht and Charles MacArthur (Williamstown Theatre Festival, Williamstown, Massachusetts).
 April 2009: Plays Brian opposite Bobby Cannavale, Jackie Hoffman, and Sarah Paulson in The Gingerbread House play by Mark Schultz (Rattlesticks Playwrights Theater, New York City, New York).
 August 2009: Plays central role of 'Stage Manager' in Our Town play by Thornton Wilder (Barrow Street Theatre, New York City, New York).
 February 2010: Plays Alex opposite Jason O'Mara in Serenading Louie play by Lanford Wilson (Donmar Warehouse, London, England).
 October 2010: Plays opposite Glenn Close, Victor Garber, John Benjamin Hickey, Joe Mantello, Jack McBrayer, Michael Stuhlbarg, and Patrick Wilson in a staged reading of The Normal Heart directed by Joel Grey play by Larry Kramer (Walter Kerr Theatre, New York, New York).
 March 2011: Plays opposite Dennis Staroselsky in a staged reading of The Skin of Our Teeth directed by Anthony Rapp play by Thornton Wilder (Wimberly Theatre of the Boston Center for the Arts, Boston, Massachusetts).
 May 2011: Plays Martin opposite Carey Mulligan and Chris Sarandon in Through a Glass Darkly directed by David Leveaux play by Jenny Worton based on film by Ingmar Bergman (New York Theatre Workshop, New York, New York).
 March–April 2016: Plays Rev. Samuel Parris in Arthur Miller's The Crucible opposite Ben Whishaw, Saoirse Ronan, and Jenny Jules, in production directed by Ivo van Hove (Walter Kerr Theatre, New York, New York).

Filmography

Films

Television

Other works

Harner narrates the audio book version of Dark prophecy: a Level 26 thriller featuring Steve Dark, . The book is written by Anthony Zuiker and Duane Swierczynski.

Awards
 Nominated for a 2006 Drama Desk Award for the Laura Pels Theatre's production of The Paris Letter.
 Received 2005 Obie Award for his performance in the controversial production of Hedda Gabler at New York Theatre Workshop.

References

External links

 
 Jason Butler Harner at the Internet Off-Broadway Database
 Jason Butler Harner at Broadway.com

1970 births
American male film actors
American male stage actors
Living people
People from Elmira, New York
Tisch School of the Arts alumni
20th-century American male actors
21st-century American male actors
American male television actors
Male actors from New York (state)
Male actors from Virginia
Virginia Commonwealth University alumni
T. C. Williams High School alumni